The Best of Sade is the first greatest hits album by English band Sade, released by Epic Records in the United Kingdom on 31 October 1994 and in the United States on 4 November 1994. The compilation chronicles Sade's first four studio albums, while also including non-single songs "Jezebel", "Like a Tattoo" and "Pearls", as well as "Please Send Me Someone to Love", which appeared in the soundtrack to the film Philadelphia. The album was digitally remastered in 2000.

The singles from Diamond Life, as well as Stronger Than Prides "Paradise" and "Nothing Can Come Between Us", are presented in their 7″ edit forms; "Never as Good as the First Time" and "Cherish the Day" are remixes produced by Sade, also taken from their respective singles. None of this information is listed within the packaging.

Critical reception
AllMusic's Jason Elias wrote, "By the time this was released in 1994, something unexpected happened. Sade's early work became classic and the later additions boasted even better vocals and songs that nicely improved on the theme. The timeless sound and class always exhibited makes Sade Adu and her band a no-brainer for an appealing compilation. Like Al Green's Greatest Hits, The Best of Sade doesn't detract from the original albums and is a marker of time, not the end of the act... Despite its riches, The Best of Sade doesn't include all of the best, since 'Maureen' and or 'Keep Looking' aren't here. It's a small complaint and The Best of Sade is a great overview." Robert Christgau called the album "another loungecore alternative".

Track listing

Notes
  signifies a co-producer

Personnel
Credits adapted from the liner notes of The Best of Sade.

Sade
 Sade Adu – vocals
 Andrew Hale – keyboards
 Stuart Matthewman – guitar, saxophone
 Paul S. Denman – bass

Additional musicians

 Dave Early – drums, percussion 
 Martin Ditcham – percussion ; drums 
 Paul Cooke – drums 
 Terry Bailey – trumpet 
 Gordon Matthewman – trumpet 
 Pete Beachill – trombone 
 Leroy Osbourne – vocals 
 Jake Jacas – vocals 
 Gordon Hunte – guitar 
 Nick Ingman – string arrangements 
 Gavyn Wright – orchestra leader 
 Tony Pleeth – solo cello 
 Karl Van Den Bossche – percussion 
 Trevor Murrell – drums

Technical

 Robin Millar – production 
 Mike Pela – production engineering ; production ; engineering, co-production 
 Pete Brown – engineering assistance 
 Simon Driscoll – engineering assistance 
 Ben Rogan – production ; engineering, co-production 
 Sade – production , arrangement 
 Phil Legg – engineering assistance 
 Melanie West – engineering assistance 
 Vince McCartney – engineering assistance 
 Franck Segarra – engineering assistance 
 Olivier de Bosson – engineering assistance 
 Alain Lubrano – engineering assistance 
 Jean-Christophe Vareille – engineering assistance 
 Sandro Franchin – engineering assistance 
 Adrian Moore – engineering assistance 
 Marc Williams – engineering assistance 
 Hein Hoven – production, mixing 
 Ian Cooper – mastering

Artwork
 Albert Watson – photography
 Jo Strettel – photography
 Peter Brawne – design

Charts

Weekly charts

Year-end charts

Certifications

Notes

References

1994 greatest hits albums
Albums produced by Robin Millar
Epic Records compilation albums
Sade (band) compilation albums